The Santa Cruz Mudstone is a geologic formation in California. The siliceous organic mudstones of the formation were deposited in deep water and fluvial environments. The formation overlies the Santa Margarita Sandstone and is overlain by the Purisima Formation. The Santa Cruz Mudstone was formerly considered part of the Monterey Formation. The formation preserves bivalve and echinoid fossils as well as vertebrates of Parabalaenoptera baulinensis and Otodus megalodon. The formation dates back to the Late Miocene (Tortonian to Messinian) period.

See also 

 List of fossiliferous stratigraphic units in California
 Paleontology in California

References

Further reading 
 J. C. Clark. 1981. Stratigraphy, paleontology, and geology of the Central Santa Cruz Mountains, California Coast Ranges. United States Geological Survey Professional Paper 1168:1-51
 D. S. Jordan and H. Hanibal. 1923. Fossil sharks and rays of the Pacific slope of North America. Bulletin of the Southern California Academy of Sciences 22:27-63
 C. V. Zeigler, G. L. Chan, and L. G. Barnes. 1997. A new late Miocene balaenopterid whale (Cetacea: Mysticeti), Parabalaenoptera baulinensis, (new genus and species) from the Santa Cruz Mudstone, Point Reyes Peninsula, California. Proceedings of the California Academy of Sciences 50(4):115-138

Geologic formations of California
Neogene California
Messinian
Tortonian
Mudstone formations
Deep marine deposits
Fluvial deposits
Paleontology in California